Martínkov is a municipality and village in Třebíč District in the Vysočina Region of the Czech Republic. It has about 200 inhabitants.

Notable people
Václav Kosmák (1843–1898), writer and satirist
Otto Albert Tichý (1890–1973), composer and organist

References

Villages in Třebíč District